John Chester "Chet" MacRae MC (August 29, 1912 – October 5, 1997) was a Canadian school teacher, soldier, and politician. Known by his second name, Chester, he was widely referred to as "Chet."

Born in Hope Town, Quebec, MacRae lived most of his life in the Province of New Brunswick. He graduated from high school in Campbellton, New Brunswick then attended the provincial Normal School in Fredericton. He taught in the public school system until 1940.

A veteran of World War II, serving in the Canadian Army he rose to the rank of captain in New Brunswick's North Shore Regiment and participated in the D-Day Normandy Landings in France. He was awarded a number of medals including the Military Cross. In later years he was appointed an honorary Colonel of the First Battalion Royal New Brunswick Regiment, the Carleton-York regiment.

MacRae was first elected to the House of Commons of Canada in 1957 as the Progressive Conservative Party's candidate in the York-Sunbury riding. He was re-elected in 1958, 1962, 1963, 1965, and 1968. He served until September 1, 1972.

He died at a Fredericton hospital in 1997.

Archives 
There is a John Chester MacRae fonds at Library and Archives Canada. Archival reference number is R3367.

Electoral history

References

 

1912 births
1997 deaths
Canadian schoolteachers
Canadian military personnel of World War II
Canadian recipients of the Military Cross
Members of the House of Commons of Canada from New Brunswick
Progressive Conservative Party of Canada MPs
People from Gaspésie–Îles-de-la-Madeleine